Intezaar is a Pakistani musical romance film directed by Masood Parvez. It was co-produced by Khwaja Khurshid Anwar who also composed the music for the film. Noor Jehan and Santosh Kumar played the leading roles in the film with Kumar appeared in the dual role in the film. The film revolves around a blind girl from mountains who waits for her childhood loved one who lives in the city.

A musical blockbuster of its time, the film is considered as one of the best musical films of the Lollywood of all times with songs by Jehan, Kausar Parveen and Iqbal Bano and lyrics by Qateel Shifai. The songs of the film "Chand Hsaey Dunya Basey", "Jis Din Se Piya Dil Le Gye", "Aa Bhi Ja" and "O Janey Waley" became memorable.

Plot 

Nimmi, a blind girl with a melodious voice lives in a hilly village. She awaits for her childhood friend, Saleem who used to live here fifteen years ago in their childhood. However, they couldn't keep in touch as Slaeem's mother doesn't like her son's friendship with a singer's daughter. Years after when his mother dies, he goes to the mountains to meet Nimmi but there he meets Chhemo, Nimmi's cousin. On the advise of Lachoo, Chhemo deceives Saleem and introduces herself as Nimmi to him, so that she can get her wealth. On the other hand, Nimmi feels that something is wrong as she finds that Saleem is near to her.

Things take a turn for all of them when a theatre manager offers a job to both Nimmi and Chhemo in his theater in Karachi. The time finally arrives when Nimmi discovers about Saleem and has yet to meet him but he gets prey of Lachoo's attack who injures his leg and throws him from the bridge. Nimmi then goes to Karachi where she sings the songs in the theater. The theatre was actually belonged to Saleem's twin brother Naeem who falls in love with her.

Cast 

 Noor Jehan as Nimmi
 Santosh Kumar as Saleem/ Naeem
 Asha Posley as Chhemo
 Majeed
 Rakhshi
 Ghulam Mohammed

Soundtrack

Release 

The film was released on 12 May 1956. It also had a theatrical release in India.

Reception 

Mushtaq Gazdar, a well-known film critic, in his book "Pakistan Cinema 1947 - 1997" termed the some of the songs of the film as 'immortal masterpieces of classic film music'.

Lata Mangeshkar termed the music of the film as one of her favourite Pakistani music score.

References

External links 

 

1950s Urdu-language films
Pakistani romantic musical films
Urdu-language Pakistani films
Pakistani black-and-white films
Films directed by Masood Parvez